Ammal is a town and commune in Boumerdès Province, Algeria. According to the 1998 census it has a population of 8,567.

Villages
The villages of the commune of Ammal are:

History

French conquest

 Expedition of the Col des Beni Aïcha (1837)
 First Battle of the Issers (1837)
 Battle of the Col des Beni Aïcha (1871)

Algerian Revolution

 Ferme Gauthier

Salafist terrorism

 2010 Ammal bombing (11 June 2010)

Rivers
This commune is crossed by several rivers:
 Isser River

Football clubs

Notable people

 Mohamed Arkab, Algerian politician.

References

Communes of Boumerdès Province